There are over 9,000 Grade I listed buildings in England. This page is a list of these buildings in the district of Ashford in Kent.

List of buildings

|}

See also
Grade II* listed buildings in Ashford (borough)

Notes

External links

Ashford

Ashford